Winterbottom's sign is a swelling of lymph nodes (lymphadenopathy) along the posterior cervical lymph node chain, associated with the early phase of African trypanosomiasis (African sleeping sickness), a disease caused by the parasites Trypanosoma brucei rhodesiense and Trypanosoma brucei gambiense. It may be suggestive of cerebral infection. Winterbottom reported about the slave traders who, apparently aware of the ominous sign of swollen cervical lymph glands, used to palpate the necks of the slaves before buying them.

The sign was first reported by the English physician Thomas Masterman Winterbottom in 1803.

References

External links
 CDC website on trypanosomiasis

Infectious diseases